"I.O.I.O." is a song by the Bee Gees, released on the album Cucumber Castle. It was written by Barry and Maurice Gibb. The song was released as a single in March 1970, and was also one of the highlights of the album. The single was a relative success mainly on European charts. Its music video is taken from the film Cucumber Castle.

It was a cult favourite of fans, however, and made it onto the compilation Best of Bee Gees, Volume 2.

Recording
The title "I.O.I.O." is derived from the calls on the chorus sung by Maurice accompanied by Colin's drumming, and Barry sings the verses and plays guitar. Former Bee Gees guitarist Vince Melouney was featured, having played the guitar on the song's first session on 12 June 1968 during sessions for Idea, but was not present when the song was finished, as he left the group following the album Odessa. The song's second session was October 8, 1969 after they had recorded "Twinky" (unreleased) and "The Chance of Love". (Pentangle drummer Terry Cox added drums on the October 8 sessions) Maurice claims that the song was not even quite finished, but it still had Barry's guide vocal on it. The song also is notable for being the only Bee Gees A-side single to feature any vocal solos from Maurice Gibb, these being on the "I.O." chant.

Musical structure

It marked the group's first conscious delving into what is now called 'world music'. According to Robin Gibb, it grew out of Barry's visit to Africa. Maurice Gibb described this as "Barry's African jaunt". This is evident from the percussion break at the song's beginning.

Cash Box stated that the song "introduces a new sound to the act, more tempo and rhythm effectiveness...and a melodic shift that shines a new light on the group."

Personnel
 Barry Gibb — lead and harmony vocals, acoustic guitar
 Maurice Gibb — backing vocals, bass, piano, organ, acoustic guitar
 Vince Melouney — acoustic guitar
 Colin Petersen — drums
 Terry Cox — drums
 Uncredited — percussions

Charts

Weekly charts

Year-end charts

Cover versions
 In 1972 TV actor Butch Patrick, backed by the band Sugarloaf, released a version produced by Frank Slay.
 American boy band B3 released a cover in 2002, which was a hit in Germany reaching #4 in the German charts and becoming their biggest chart success. 
 Also in 2002, the song became a huge hit for South African singer Kurt Darren in an adapted Afrikaans language version called "IO Meisie"
 Mandarin version of the song is covered by S.H.E from their 4th studio album Super Star using the same tune and the "I.O.I.O" chorus. In Taiwanese Mandarin the "I.O.I.O." chorus sounds similar to love me, love me (愛我，愛我).

B3 version

Weekly charts

Year-end charts

References

1970 singles
Bee Gees songs
Songs written by Barry Gibb
Songs written by Maurice Gibb
Song recordings produced by Robert Stigwood
Song recordings produced by Barry Gibb
Song recordings produced by Maurice Gibb
Polydor Records singles
Atco Records singles